Mohammad Shoaib is the name of:
 Muhammad Shoaib (1907–1997), Pakistani finance minister
 Mohammad Shoaib (Constitutional Loya Jirga), delegate to Afghanistan's Constitutional Loya Jirga
 Mohammad Shoaib (Bangladeshi politician), politician from the Dinajpur District of Bangladesh